Dun Pawl Branchel (Fr. Paul Branchel) was the first chaplain (Archpriest) of Zejtun. He was already chaplain in 1436 and stayed at this place till 1492. At that time the parish church of Zejtun was that of "San Girgor" (Saint Gregory),and also was smaller than today. The parish of Zejtun at that time was including also the new parishes of Zabbar, Ghaxaq, Marsaxlokk, Marsascala and part of Birzebbuga of today.

References
 Zejtun B Primary School (maltese)
 Zejtun B Primary School (english)
  Knisja Arcipretali ta’ Santa Katerina, iz-Zejtun

Maltese Roman Catholic priests
15th-century Roman Catholic priests